Little Angie may refer to:
"Little Angie", a song by Don Patterson on the album Funk You!
Angelo "Little Angie" Tuminaro, a mafia member involved with the French Connection
Angelo Rossitto (1908–1991), American actor and voice artist